is a Japanese professional shogi player ranked 8-dan. He is a former director of the Japan Shogi Association.

Early life
Sanada was born on October 6, 1972, in Yachiyo, Chiba. In 1985, he entered the Japan Shogi Association's apprentice school when he was twelve years old at the rank of 6-kyū as a student of shogi professional . He was promoted to the rank of 1-dan in 1988, and obtained full professional status and the rank of 4-dan in April 1992.

Promotion history
Sanada's promotion history is as follows:

 6-kyū: 1985
 1-dan: 1988
 4-dan: April 1, 1992
 5-dan: April 1, 1994
 6-dan: October 1, 1997
 7-dan: March 1, 2005
 8-dan: October 25, 2016

Titles and other championships
Sanada's only appearance in a major title match came in 1997 when he was the challenger for the 10th Ryūō title.

Awards and honors
Sanada received the Japan Shogi Association Annual Shogi Award for "Best New Player" in 1997.

JSA director
Sanada served on the Japan Shogi Association's board of directors from 1999 until 2003. He was elected for his first two-year term as a director at the association's 50th General Meeting in May 1999,
and then re-elected to a second two-year term at the association's 52nd General Meeting in May 2001.

Personal life
Sanada's wife Ayako is a retired female shogi professional.

References

External links
ShogiHub: Professional Player Info · Sanada, Keiichi

Japanese shogi players
People from Yachiyo, Chiba
Living people
Professional shogi players
Professional shogi players from Chiba Prefecture
1972 births